Dhadkan was an Indian medical drama television series produced by Jeetu Chawla, and directed by Umesh Padalkar which premiered on Sony TV on 4 February 2002. The concept was based on American television series, ER which ran on NBC. The show aired Monday to Wednesday evenings.

Cast
Suresh Oberoi as Dr. Raj Pradhan
Reema Lagoo as Dr. Prajakta Marathe, Gynecologist 
Vineet Kumar as Dr. Amar Marathe, Cardiologist
Ram Kapoor as Dr. Rajiv Agarwal, Psychologist
Sushant Singh as Dr. Alan Fernandes, (former army) doctor
Mona Ambegaonkar as Dr. Chitra Sheshadri, pediatrician
Achint Kaur as Miss Mallika Sareen
Aarav Chowdhary
Kishwer Merchant as Dr. Aditi
Gautami Kapoor as Chanchal, patient (credited as Gautami Gadgil)
Kabir Sadanand as Dr. Rehaan

Spin-off

In 2021, Sony Entertainment Television launched a spin-off version of series on 6 December 2021 starring Additi Gupta, Rohit Purohit, Vidyut Xavier. The series was initially planned with 65 episodes, but later it was extended by ten more episodes, for a total of 75 episodes till 4 March 2022.

References

External links
Dhadkan News Article on Indiantelevision.com
 

Sony Entertainment Television original programming
2002 Indian television series debuts
Indian drama television series
Indian medical television series